Citrus macroptera, also known as shatkora or hatkhora cabuyao, Melanesian papeda, or wild orange, is a semi-wild species of citrus native to the Sylhet region (South Asia), Malesia and Melanesia.

Some authorities consider C. macroptera to be a taxonomic synonym of C. hystrix (kaffir lime), while others consider C. macroptera var. annamensis to be a synonym of C. hystrix, but not C. macroptera var. macroptera.

Description 
Citrus macroptera is so-named because of the large "wings" (-ptera) on the petiole, which is as large as the blade of the leaf.
The tree, which has thorns, can reach  in height. The pulp of the fruit is greenish-yellow and dry (does not produce much juice). The juice is very bitter, and somewhat sour.

Varieties 
The species is sometimes divided into four varieties, or alternatively into three separate species, as follows:
 C. macroptera var. macroptera
 C. macroptera var. annamensis Tanaka  -> C. combara Raf.
 C. macroptera var. combara (Raf.) Tanaka  -> C. combara Raf.
 C. macroptera var. kerrii Swingle  -> C. kerrii (Swingle) Tanaka

Cultivation 

A cultivar of C. macroptera var. annamensis known as 'Sat Kara', is grown primarily in the Sylhet Division of northeastern Bangladesh where it is called "hatkhora".

Uses

Culinary uses 
In Bangladesh, the thick fleshy rind of Citrus macroptera is eaten as a vegetable, while the pulp is usually discarded because of its bitter-sour taste.  The thick rind is cut into small pieces and cooked (either green or ripe) in beef, mutton, and fish curries. The rind is often sun-dried for later cooking and consumption. The fruit is also a primary ingredient in satkora/shatkora pickles. It is also used in doner kebabs in British Bangladeshi fast-food restaurants.

Perfumery 
Many of the C. macroptera var. annamensis fruits are exported from Bangladesh, exacting a high price because their oil is used in the perfume industry.

See also 
 Bangladeshi cuisine
 Beef Hatkora
 Citrus latipes a similar-looking species native to Northeast India

References

External links 
 USDA PLANTS profile 

macroptera
Agriculture in Bangladesh
Bangladeshi cuisine
Bengali cuisine
Economy of Bangladesh
Flora of tropical Asia
Medicinal plants of Asia
Medicinal plants of Oceania
Sylheti cuisine